The following is a list of characters from the American comedy-drama television series Greek.

Main characters

Supporting characters 
These characters have been featured in more than 20 episodes of Greek.

Recurring characters
These characters have appeared in less than 20 episodes of Greek. Some of the characters had prominent roles during certain chapters.

References

External links
 Greek Official Website
 https://www.imdb.com/title/tt0976014/fullcredits#cast

Lists of American comedy-drama television series characters